Francis Patrick Sheehan  (17 August 1937 – 5 May 2021) was an Australian politician and community advocate from Ballarat.

Sheehan was born in Ballarat to farmer Cornelius Joseph Sheehan and Kathleen Veronica O'Donohue. He attended local Catholic schools and became a motor trades instructor, with a Trained Trade Instructors Certificate and Diploma of Technical Education from Hawthorn State College. From 1964 to 1966 he was national president of Young Christian Workers; in 1967 he joined the Labor Party. In 1982 he was elected to the  Victorian Legislative Assembly as the member for Ballarat South. He served until 1992, when his seat was abolished and he was defeated in Ballarat East.

After losing his seat he continued working for the Overseas Service Bureau (now Australian Volunteers International). He was active in the Ballarat Diocesan Ecological Sustainability Group. Sheehan was also an outspoken advocate for victims of historical sexual abuse within the Catholic Church, founding the Moving Towards Justice support group.

In 2018 he was awarded the Medal of the Order of Australia for his service to the Ballarat community, he cited the creation of workplace laws as one of his greatest achievements.

Sheehan died in May 2021, aged 83.

References

1937 births
2021 deaths
Members of the Victorian Legislative Assembly
Australian Labor Party members of the Parliament of Victoria
People from Ballarat
Recipients of the Medal of the Order of Australia
University of Melbourne alumni